The 2009 College Basketball Invitational (CBI) was a single-elimination tournament of 16 National Collegiate Athletic Association (NCAA) Division I teams that did not participate in the 2009 NCAA Men's Division I Basketball Tournament or the 2009 National Invitation Tournament. The opening round began Tuesday, March 17. A best-of-three championship series between Oregon State and UTEP resulted in an Oregon State victory on April 3. The 2009 CBI marked the first ever postseason tournament championship for Oregon State as well as a successful conclusion to head coach Craig Robinson's first year. The Beavers were honored with a visit to the White House with president Barack Obama; Robinson is the brother of First Lady Michelle Obama.

Participants

Round 1 away teams

Round 1 home teams

Bracket
The bracket for the 2009 College Basketball Invitational was announced on March 15, 2009.

* Denotes overtime period.

References

College Basketball Invitational
College Basketball Invitational